Santhanadevan is a 1939 Indian, Tamil language film directed by S. Nottani. The film stars G. M. Basheer and P. Bhanumathi.

Cast
G. M. Basheer
P. Bhanumathi
M. R. Radha
P. S. Gnanam
Jeevarathnam
Laxminarayan
Devanath
Devaraj
Udaiyar

Production
The film was produced by T. R. Sundaram under the banner Modern Theatres and was directed by S. Nottani. D. B. S. Mani wrote the screenplay and dialogues.

Soundtrack
Music was composed by G. Rajagopal Naidu and the lyrics were penned by D. B. Velauthasamy. Singers are P. Bhanumathi and U. R. Jeevarathinam.

Song - Singer
Maarudhale Yaavum - P. Bhanumathi
Adhi Param Porule - U. R. Jeevarathinam
Kaariyamadhile - U. R. Jeevarathinam
Veesudhu Malarin - P. S. Gnanam
Dayaa Nithiye - P. Bhanumathi

Notes & References

External links
 - Full length film

1930s Tamil-language films
Indian black-and-white films
Films scored by G. Rajagopal Naidu